NWT can mean:
 New World Telecommunications, an Asian telecommunications company
 The New World Translation of the Holy Scriptures, Jehovah's Witnesses' translation of the Bible
 Net Worth Tax or Net Wealth Tax, a levy based on the aggregate value of all household assets
 Norfolk Wildlife Trust
 North West Telecom, telecommunications company serving northwestern Russia
 North West Tonight, the local BBC news broadcast for North West England
 Northwest Territories, a territory of Canada
 Nya Wermlands-Tidningen, a local newspaper published in Värmland, Sweden